Moshe Dluznowsky (Dunow) (1903–1977), was a Polish-born journalist, publicist, writer, dramatist, and editor of the journal .

Origin and family 
Born on 22 February (or 9 February according to the Russian [Julianic] calendar) 1903 at 7 a.m. in Tomaszow Rawski (now Tomaszow Mazowiecki in Poland; then in Russian Empire). He originated from an unpropertied Jewish family. His father Mordka Henokh Dłużnowski (1870–1934) was a small shopkeeper in Tomaszów, who with his wife Estera née Piyus (1870-1942?) created also Yuda Beyer vel Bernard (1894-1942?), a Tomaszowian weaver, Abram (1896–1942), Yuda (born in 1899), Noach and the youngest daughter Sara (born in 1905).

Moshe Dluznowsky (Dunow) married Berta Klebanow in July 1947 in New York City. Berta was born in Minsk, emigrated to the United States at an early age. She was involved in Yiddish cultural activities and was a teacher.  
Moshe's daughter, Esti Dunow (born in 1948) is a painter and art historian, expert on the work of the painter Chaïm Soutine, co-author of the Chaïm Soutine Catalogue Raisonne.
Moshe's son Henry Dunow (born in 1953) is a literary agent and co-owner (from 1997) "Dunow, Carlson and Lerner Literary Agency". He wrote a memory on his father and family (see The Way Home: Scenes from a Season, Lessons from a Lifetime, New York  2001).

Education and journalistic work
Moshe was educated in his native Tomaszow. He finished Itzhak Milter's primary Jewish school (cheder), which was a hot-bed for many writers and journalists who wrote their literary works in Yiddish. From 1925 to 1930 he was an editor of the local journal "Tomaszower Wokhenblat", published in Yiddish. He was also a member of the Zionist party "Poale Zion". In 1930 he left his familiar town and emigrated to France. He settled down in Paris, where his elder brother Abram resided (Abram was arrested in Paris after the Nazi conquest of France and finally was sent to the concentration camp Auschwitz; he was murdered there on 25 April 1942). In Paris Dluznowsky was a correspondent of a number of Jewish journals, e.g. "Parizer Wokhenblat". Before the Nazi conquest of France he left for Morocco and in 1942 moved to the United States.

Life and works in U.S.A. 
There he settled in New York. Moshe Dluznowsky composed numerous novels, essays and theatrical works written in Yiddish. He belonged to the American association of the Jewish writers (Yiddish PEN Club). Moshe Dluznowsky's novels, essays, and art criticism appeared regularly in the New York Yiddish newspaper, The Forward, as well as in periodicals and journals in Paris, Buenos Aires, Mexico City, and Israel. He maintained contacts with other Jewish writers from Poland, such as Isaac Bashevis Singer. In his book Dos Rod fun Mazl ("Fortune's wheel", New York 1949, pp. 419), written in Yiddish, Moshe Dluznowsky shared interesting recollections of his family's town Tomaszów. He was awarded the Zvi Kessel Literary Prize in 1949.

He published a number of other books in Yiddish: 
  ("A well near the road", Buenos Aires 1953, pp. 254)
  ("Autumn in the vineyard: novella and dramas", Buenos Aires 1956, pp. 321)
  (Buenos Aires 1958)
  ("Like a tree in a field", Buenos Aires 1958, pp. 492)
  ("Windmills", Buenos Aires 1963, pp. 560)
  ("Doors and windows", Buenos Aires 1966, pp. 228)

Some of his works (e.g. ) were published in Spanish (Buenos Aires 1959, translated by Arie Zafrán y Susana R. de Zafrán, pp. 503) and in English (The Potter's Daughter, London 1959). The most known Dluznowsky's drama  ("The Lonesome Ship") was successfully produced in New York, Los Angeles (by Maurice Schwartz) and in Ida Kaminska's Jewish Theater in Warsaw (Polish first performance: June 17, 1961).

He died on July 30, 1977 in New York.

Selected bibliography
A. Cygielman, Tomaszow Mazowiecki, in: Encyclopaedia Judaica, vol. 15, Jerusalem 1982, p. 1215 (Moshe Dolzenowsky);
Henry Dunow, The Way Home: Scenes from a Season, Lessons from a Lifetime, New York 2001, pp. 65–84, 188-193, 229-230;
Beate Kosmala, Juden und Deutsche im polnischen Haus. Tomaszów Mazowiecki 1914-1939, Berlin 2001, pp. 47, 99-101 (in German);
B. Katz, Moyshe Dluznovski, "Mendele: Yiddish Literature and Yiddish Language", vol. 7, No. 164, 6 III 1998;
J. Leftwich (ed.), An Anthology of Modern Yiddish Literature, The Hague – Paris 1974, pp. 329–330 (biographical note);
F. Mohrer, M. Web (eds.), Guide to the YIVO Archives, New York 1997, p. 68;
N. Sandrow, Vagabond Stars: A World History of Yiddish Theater, Syracuse 1996, pp. VI, 256, 406, 431, 436 (Moyshe Dluzhnovsky);
Krzysztof Tomasz Witczak, Słownik biograficzny Żydów tomaszowskich Biographical Dictionary of Jews from Tomaszów Mazowiecki, Łódź - Tomaszów Mazowiecki 2010, Wydawnictwo Uniwersytetu Łódzkiego, s. 78-79 (phot., biographical note in Polish s.v. Dłużnowski Moszek).

External links
Moshe Dluznowsky books and audiobooks in the Yiddish Book Center digital library

People from Tomaszów Mazowiecki
Polish emigrants to the United States
American people of Polish-Jewish descent
Jewish American novelists
Jewish American dramatists and playwrights
Jews who emigrated to escape Nazism
Novelists from New York (state)
Yiddish-language writers
1903 births
1977 deaths
20th-century American novelists
20th-century American dramatists and playwrights
American male novelists
American male dramatists and playwrights
American male short story writers
20th-century American short story writers
20th-century American male writers
20th-century American Jews